Sharara is a 1984 Indian Hindi-language film directed by Rajendra Singh Babu, starring Raaj Kumar, Shatrughan Sinha, Hema Malini, Mithun Chakraborty, Tina Munim, Vijayendra Ghatge, Ranjeet, Shakti Kapoor and Kader Khan. The playwright of the movie is senior story writer late H. V. Subba Rao. The plot of the movie was inspired by the 1980 political thriller novel The Second Lady by Irving Wallace.

Plot
Sharara is an action film starring Raaj Kumar, Shatrughan Sinha in lead role and Mithun Chakraborty in friendly appearance Hema Malini most important character in the movie in a double role, Tina Munim,  Amjad Khan and Ranjeet. Actress Hema Malini is understood to have produced the film. The title song of the film was very popular when released. The film received positive reviews at the time of its release mainly due to the star-studded cast and great acting performances by the stars.

Songs
All songs are written by Anand Bakshi. Soundtrack is available on CBS Gramophones Records and Tapes (now Sony Music India).

Cast
Raaj Kumar as Dharam Veer Singh Pathan
Shatrughan Sinha as Vicky
Hema Malini as Madhu / Champavati (Dual Role)
Mithun Chakraborty as Deepak
Tina Munim as Rashmi
Vijayendra Ghatge as Ramakant
Ranjeet as Simon
Shakti Kapoor as Mr. Kapoor
Kader Khan as K. K.

References

External links
 
 http://ibosnetwork.com/asp/filmbodetails.asp?id=Sharara

1984 films
1980s Hindi-language films
Indian action films
Films scored by Laxmikant–Pyarelal
Films based on American novels
Films based on works by Irving Wallace
1984 action films
Hindi-language action films
Films directed by Rajendra Singh Babu